Chomolhari Kang is a 7046m mountain in the Himalayas in Gasa District, Bhutan near the border with Tibet, China. Quotes on its height vary from 7034m to 7121m, but 7046m is the most common figure. A Chinese crew who first climbed the mountain in 2013 reported a GPS height of 7,054m.

The term Chomo means "goddess" or "lady" in Tibetan.

Location 
Sources often characterize the mountain as being on the border between China and Bhutan.

History 
Chomolhari Kang was first climbed in 2013 by a Chinese crew consisting of Zhou Peng and Li Shuang. There exists no prior record of climbing.

In 2016, the Mountaineering Association of Peking University (MAPKU) made an attempt that ended at an altitude of 6600m.

See also 
 Mountains of Bhutan
 Chomo Lonzo
 Chomo Yummo
 Chomolungma
 Chomo Lhari

References

Seven-thousanders of the Himalayas
Mountains of Bhutan
Mountains of Tibet
Bhutan–China border
International mountains of Asia